Pechahalee Creek is a stream in the U.S. state of Mississippi.

The origin of the name "Pechahalee Creek" is unclear. Pechahalee may be a name derived from the Chickasaw language signifying "splash, spray".

References

Rivers of Mississippi
Rivers of Benton County, Mississippi
Mississippi placenames of Native American origin